Frederick William Percy Hansen (31 May 1903 – 15 November 1993) was an Australian rules footballer who played with Footscray and Hawthorn in the Victorian Football League (VFL).

Notes

External links 

1903 births
1993 deaths
Australian rules footballers from Victoria (Australia)
Western Bulldogs players
Hawthorn Football Club players